The Corey House, at 106 N. E St. in Bridger, Montana, was listed on the National Register of Historic Places in 1987.

It was deemed "architecturally significant as a distinctive example of an Arts and Crafts style residence in Bridger".  It was built in 1907 for developer L.A. Corey by builder R.R. Crool.

It stands adjacent to Arts and Crafts-style Glidden House, also National Register-listed.

References

Houses on the National Register of Historic Places in Montana
Houses completed in 1907
National Register of Historic Places in Carbon County, Montana
1907 establishments in Montana
Arts and Crafts architecture in the United States
Houses in Carbon County, Montana